Kabutargeran (also Romanized as Kabūtargerān) is a village in Susan-e Gharbi Rural District, Susan District, Izeh County, Khuzestan Province, Iran. At the 2006 census, its population was 32, in 5 families.

References 

Populated places in Izeh County